Encyosaccus is a genus of South American orb-weaver spiders containing the single species, Encyosaccus sexmaculatus. It was first described by Eugène Simon in 1895, and has only been found in Colombia, Ecuador, Peru, and Brazil.

Description 
Encyosaccus sexmaculatus is dark orange, with a black tarsus (the last leg segment). The dorsal side of the abdomen is light orange spotted with black. A white border, a white line running on the anterior-posterior axis, and two lines running on the left-right axis, segment the orange area into six sections.

References

Araneidae
Monotypic Araneomorphae genera
Spiders of South America
Taxa named by Eugène Simon